Jaroslav Boroš (born 1 January 1947 in Vranov nad Topľou, Czechoslovakia) is a former Slovak football striker who played for his hometown club Vranov nad Topľou and since his 18 years for VSS Košice from 1965 to 1977. He played overall 236 matches and scored 45 goals during his career at the Czechoslovak First League.

Boroš made one appearance for the Czechoslovakia national football team against Spain in the UEFA Euro 1968 qualifying loss 1-2 at Santiago Bernabéu Stadium. He also played for Czechoslovakia at the 1968 Summer Olympics and for the Czechoslovakia national under-23 team.

External links
Jaroslav Boroš  at The Football Association of the Czech Republic
FIFA.com

1947 births
Living people
Slovak footballers
Czechoslovak footballers
Czechoslovakia international footballers
FC VSS Košice players
Olympic footballers of Czechoslovakia
Footballers at the 1968 Summer Olympics
People from Vranov nad Topľou
Sportspeople from the Prešov Region
Association football forwards